Mahane Israel (Hebrew: מחנה ישראל, Mahaneh Yisra'el) is the second Jewish neighborhood built outside the walls of the Old City of Jerusalem after Mishkenot Shaananim.

History

Mahane Israel was the first neighborhood built by residents of the Old City on their own behalf, as part of the expansion of Jerusalem in the 19th century (Hebrew: היציאה מן החומות). Mahane Israel  was built by and for Jews from Maghreb (western North Africa). It was established by the Moroccan-born Jewish leader, Rav David Ben-Shimon in 1867. Although the neighborhood was described as very small, it wasn't significantly smaller than other neighborhoods built at the same period. Men studied in different shifts throughout the night in the central shul, Tzuf Devash, for spiritual reasons and also to fend off possible nighttime attacks. Maghrebian Jews at the end of the 19th century numbered more than 2,000 persons, comprising 25% of the entire Sephardic community in Jerusalem.

References

See also
 Expansion of Jerusalem in the 19th century
 North Africa Jewish Heritage Center

Neighbourhoods of Jerusalem
1868 establishments in Ottoman Syria